The Khanate of Kazan was a medieval Tatar Turkic state that occupied the territory of former Volga Bulgaria between 1438 and 1552. The khanate covered contemporary Tatarstan, Mari El, Chuvashia, Mordovia, and parts of Udmurtia and Bashkortostan; its capital was the city of Kazan. It was one of the successor states of the Golden Horde (Kipchak Khanate), and it came to an end when it was conquered by the Tsardom of Russia.

Geography and population
The territory of the khanate comprised the Muslim Bulgar-populated lands of the Bolğar, Cükätäw, Kazan, and Qaşan duchies and other regions that originally belonged to Volga Bulgaria. The Volga, Kama and Vyatka were the main rivers of the khanate, as well as the major trade ways. The majority of the population were Kazan Tatars. Their self-identity was not restricted to Tatars; many identified themselves simply as Muslims or as "the people of Kazan". Islam was the state religion.

The local feudal nobility consisted of ethnic Bulgars, but the court and bodyguard of the Kazan khans were composed of steppe Tatar (Kipchaks, and later of Nogais) that lived in Kazan. According to the Ginghizide tradition, the local Turkic tribes were also called Tatars by the steppe nobility and, later, by the Russian elite. Part of the higher nobility hailed from the Golden Horde. It included members of four leading noble families: Arghin, Barin, Qipchaq, and Shirin.

Peoples subject to the khan included the Chuvash, Mari, Mordva, Mishar Tatars, Udmurt, and Bashkir. The Permians and some of the Komi tribes were also incorporated into the Khanate. The Mishars had arrived during the period of the Golden Horde and gradually assimilated the resident Finnic Mordvins and Burtas. Their territory was governed by former steppe Tatars. Some Mishar duchies were never controlled from Kazan and instead gravitated towards the Qasim Khanate or Muscovite Russia.

Most of the khanate territory was covered by forests, and only the southern part adjoined the steppe. The main population of the steppes were the nomadic Manghites, also known as Nogais, who sometimes recognized the rule of the Kazan khan, but more often raided agricultural Tatars and Chuvash, as they had done in the Golden Horde period. Later, Nogais were transplanted and replaced with Kalmyks. More recently, this area was settled by Tatars, Chuvash and Russians, who erected defensive walls to guard the southern border. Since the khanate was established, Tatar Cossack troops defended the khanate from the Nogais.

Russian sources indicate that at least five languages were used in the Kazan khanate. The first and foremost was the Tatar language, including the Middle dialect of the Kazan Tatars and the Western dialect of the Mishars. Its written form (Old Tatar language) was the favoured language of the state. The Chuvash language was a descendant of the Bolgar language, spoken by the pagan Chuvash people. The Bolgar language also strongly influenced the Middle dialect of Tatar language. The other three were probably the Mari language, the Mordvin languages and the Bashkir language, likewise developed from the Bolgar and Kipchak languages.

History
The former territories of Volga Bulgaria (Kazan Ulus or Kazan Duchy) may have regained a degree of independence within the disintegrating Golden Horde by the turn of the 15th century. The principality was self-governed and maintained a dynasty of Bolgar rulers. Whatever the status of this proto-state, the founder of the khanate was Ulugh Muhammad, who assumed the title of khan and usurped the throne of Kazan with some help from local nobility in 1437 or 1438. It has been suggested that the transfer of power from the local Bolgar dynasty to Muhammad was finalized by his son Maxmud in 1445.

Throughout its history, the khanate was prone to civil turmoil and struggles for the throne. The khans were replaced 19 times in 115 years. There were a total of fifteen reigning khans, some ascending the throne multiple times. The Khan was often elected from the Gengizides by vernacular nobility and even by the citizens themselves.

Regarding the history of the khanate, there is a scarcity of sources. Not only no single document of the khanate survived the Russian conquest, but even the documents of early Russian colonial administration (Prikaz Kazanskogo Dvortsa) were all destroyed during the Time of Troubles.

Early history

During the reign of Ulugh Muhammad and his son Maxmud, Kazan forces raided Muscovy and its subject lands several times. Vasily II of Moscow engaged in the Great Feudal War against his cousins, was defeated in a battle near Suzdal, and was forced to pay ransom to the Kazan khan.

In July 1487, Grand Duke Ivan III of Moscow occupied Kazan and seated a puppet leader, Möxämmädämin, on the Kazan throne. After that, the Kazan Khanate became a protectorate of Moscow, and Russian merchants were allowed to trade freely throughout its territory. Supporters of a union between the Ottoman Empire and the Crimean Khanate tried to exploit the population's grievances to provoke revolts (in 1496, 1500, and 1505), but with negligible results.

In 1521, Kazan emerged from the dominance of Moscow, concluding a mutual aid treaty with the Astrakhan Khanate, the Crimean Khanate and the Nogay Horde. The combined forces of khan Muhamed Giray and his Crimean allies then attacked Muscovy.

The final decade

The reinforcement of Crimea displeased the pro-Moscow elements of the Kazan Khanate, and some of these noblemen provoked a revolt in 1545. The result was the deposition of Safa Giray. A Moscow supporter, Şahğäli, occupied the throne. Following that year, Moscow organized several campaigns to impose control over Kazan, but the attempts were unsuccessful.

With the help of the Nogays, Safa Giray returned to the throne. He executed 75 noblemen, and the rest of his opposition escaped to Russia. In 1549 he died, and his 3-year-old son Ütämeşgäräy was recognized as khan. His regent and the de facto ruler of the khanate was his mother Söyembikä. The administration of the ulan Qoşçaq gained a degree of independence under her rule.

At that time Safa Giray's relatives (including Devlet I Giray) were in Crimea. Their invitation to the throne of Kazan was vitiated by a large portion of vernacular nobility. Under Qoşçaq's government relations with Russia continued to worsen. A group of disgruntled noblemen at the beginning of 1551 invited a supporter of Tsar Ivan the Terrible, Şahğäli, for the second time.

At the same time the lands to the east of the Volga River (Taw yağı) were ceded to Russia. Ütämeşgäräy, along with his mother, was sent to a Moscow prison. Şahğäli occupied the Kazan throne until February 1552. Anti-Moscow elements in the Kazan government exiled Şahğäli and invited the Astrakhan prince Yadegar Mokhammad, along with the Nogays, to aid them.

Downfall

In August 1552, forces of Ivan the Terrible, operating from the Russian castle of Sviyazhsk, laid siege to Kazan. The Russians defeated the Tatar inland troops, burnt Archa and some castles. On October 3, after two months of siege and destruction of the citadel walls, the Russians entered the city. Some defenders managed to escape but most were put to the sword. Yadegar Moxammad was imprisoned and the population was slaughtered.

After the fall of Kazan, territories such as Udmurtia and Bashkortostan joined Russia without a conflict. The administration of the khanate was wiped out; pro-Moscow and neutral nobles kept their lands, but others were executed. Tatars were then resettled far away from rivers, roads and Kazan. Free lands were settled by Russians and sometimes by pro-Russian Tatars. Orthodox bishops such as Germogen forcibly baptized many Tatars.

Resistance

Part of the population continued to resist Russian rule until 1556. Rebel governments were formed in Chalem and Mishatamaq, but as the Nogays under Ğäli Äkräm often raided the agricultural population, the coalition went to ruin. After a brutal repression against the Kazan rebels, their commanders were executed.

By some estimates, the population of the former khanate declined by several thousands during the wars. The administration, known as the Kazan Palace's Office undertook the forced Russification and Christianization of the Tatars and other peoples. The term Tsardom of Kazan was in use until 1708 when the Kazan Governorate was formed.

Economics

The Khanate's urban population produced clay ware, wood and metal handiworks, leather, armor, ploughs and jewels. The major cities included Qazan, Arça, Cükätaw, Qaşan, Çallı, Alat and Cöri. The urban population also traded with the people of Central Asia, the Caucasus, and Russia. In the 16th century, Russia became the main trading partner of Kazan, and the khanate shared the economic system of Moscow. The major markets were the Taşayaq Bazaar in Kazan and the Markiz Isle fair on the Volga River. Agricultural landownership was based on the söyurğal and hereditary estates.

Society
The khan governed the state. He based his actions on decisions and consultations of a cabinet council, or Diwan. The nobility comprised the ranks of bäk (beg), ämir (emir), and morza. Military estates consisted of the uğlan (ulan), bahadir, içki (ichki). Muslim clergy also played a major role. They were divided into säyet (seid), şäyex (sheikh), qazí (qazi), and imams. The ulema, or clergy, played a judicial role, and maintained the madrassas (schools) and maktabs (libraries).

The majority of the population comprised qara xalıq (black people), a free Muslim population
who lived on state land. The feudal lands were mostly settled by çura (serfs). Prisoners of war were usually sold to Turkey or into Central Asia. Occasionally they were sold within the Khanate as slaves (qol) and sometimes were settled on feudal lands to become çura later. The Muslim and non-Muslim population of the Khanate had to pay the yasaq.

Administration and military

The Khanate was divided into 5 daruğa: Alat, Arça, Gäreç, Cöri and Nuğay. The term daruğa translates as "direction". They replaced the "duchies" that the khanate originated from. Some feudal lords sporadically asserted independence from Kazan, but such attempts would be promptly suppressed.

The military of the khanate consisted of armament and men from the darughas and subject lands, khan guards, and the troops of the nobility. The number of soldiers was never constant, ranging from 20,000 to 60,000 in number. Often, troops from Nogay, the Crimea and Russia also served the Kazan khans. Fire-arms (arquebuse) were used for defending the walls of Kazan.

Culture

In general, the culture of the Kazan Khanate descended from that of Volga Bulgaria. Cultural elements of the Golden Horde were also present in noble circles.

A large part of the urban population was literate. Large libraries were present in mosques and madrassahs. Kazan became a center of science and theology.

Although Islamic influence predominated, lay literature also developed. The most prominent Old Tatar language poets were Möxämmädyar, Ömmi Kamal, Möxämmädämin, Ğärifbäk, and Qolşärif. Möxämmädyar renovated the traditions of Kazan poetry, and his verses were very popular.

The city of Bolghar retained its position as a sacred place, but had this function only, due to the emergence of Kazan as a major economic and political center in the 1430s.

The architecture of the khanate is characterized by white-stone architecture and wood carvings.

See also
 List of Kazan khans
 Islam in Tatarstan
 Tatar nobility
 Ar begs
 List of Turkic states and empires
 List of Sunni Muslim dynasties
 Qasim Khanate

References

 
Viacheslav Shpakovsky, David Nicolle, Gerry Embleton, Armies of the Volga Bulgars & Khanate of Kazan, 9th–16th centuries, Osprey Men-at-Arms 491 (2013).
 Azade-Ayshe Rorlich, Origins of Volga Tatars in: The Volga Tatars, a Profile in National Resilience (1986).
 Muhammad Murad Ramzi (محمد مراد الرمزي) (1908), Talfīq al-akhbār wa-talfīḥ al-āthār fī waqāʼiʻ Qazān wa-Bulghār wa-mulūk al-Tātār (تلفيق الاخبار وتلقيح الآثار في وقائع قزان وبلغار وملوك التتار), First edition (الطبعة الاولي) Volume 1 (المجلد الاول) Printed at the Al-Karīmiyyah and Al-Ḥussayniyyah printing shop in the town of "Orenburg" upon committed expenses (طبع بالمطبعة الكريمية والحسينية ببلدة "اورنبورغ" على مصاريف ملتزمه).

 
Vassal states of the Ottoman Empire
Former monarchies